Kelmscott is a village and civil parish in West Oxfordshire, England.

Kelmscott may refer to:

 Kelmscott, Western Australia
 Kelmscott railway station
 Kelmscott House, Hammersmith, England
 Kelmscott Manor, Kelmscott, England
 Kelmscott Press, Hammersmith, England
 Kelmscott School, Walthamstow, East London, England

See also